The lesser pygmy flying squirrel (Petaurillus emiliae) is a species of rodent in the family Sciuridae. It is endemic to Malaysia.

It is listed as Data Deficient because it is known only from the type specimen collected in 1901. Adequate surveys have not been done to look for this species, and so it cannot be considered Extinct.

The lesser pygmy flying squirrel is arboreal and probably prefers forest. It is threatened by habitat conversion due to agriculture and logging. There are no conservation measures in place. Further studies are needed into the taxonomy, distribution, abundance, reproduction and ecology of this species.

References

Endemic fauna of Malaysia
Rodents of Malaysia
Petaurillus
Mammals described in 1908
Taxa named by Oldfield Thomas
Taxonomy articles created by Polbot